The Piney Creek Subdivision is a railroad line owned by CSX Transportation in the U.S. state of West Virginia. It was formerly part of the CSX Huntington East Division. It became part of the CSX Florence Division on June 20, 2016.

At its east end the line continues west from the New River Subdivision and at its west end the line comes to an end. The Raleigh Southwestern and Winding Gulf Subdivision branches from it near its center, and it crosses but does not junction with the Norfolk Southern Princeton–Deepwater District near its western end.

See also
 List of CSX Transportation lines

References

CSX Transportation lines